Labaune is a French surname. Notable people with the surname include:

Christine Labaune, French physicist
Noël Labaune, French rally car driver in 1975 Monte Carlo Rally
Patrick Labaune (born 1951), French politician

French-language surnames